Janka Hlinka or Janka Hlinková (born 31 October 1995) is a Slovak-American ice hockey forward and member of the Slovak national team, currently playing in the Premier Hockey Federation (PHF) with the Connecticut Whale. Her college ice hockey career was played at Middlebury College, where she won three New England Small College Athletic Conference championships.

Playing career 
As a player with the Middlebury Panthers women's ice hockey program, Hlinka recorded 20 goals and 45 assists for a total of 65 points in 113 career NCAA Division III games. She and future Whale teammate Emily Fluke were Panther teammates for one season.

Hlinka relocated to Europe after graduating from college. She then spent two seasons with Skellefteå AIK Dam in the Swedish Damettan, where she led the team in scoring both seasons. She tallied 25 points (14+11) in 21 games over the span. 

Hlinka played in 16 regular season games with the Connecticut Whale and two playoff games of the 2021–22 PHF season, including the Whale's first appearance in the Isobel Cup.

International play
Hlinka represented Slovakia in the Division I Group A tournaments of the IIHF Women's World Championship in 2019 and 2022. She led the team in goals at the 2019 tournament, notching two across five games played.

Career statistics

Regular season and playoffs 

Note: Postseason statistics from the 2019–20 Damettan season are from the qualification series and are not included in playoff totals.

Source:

International

References

External links
 
 Janka Hlinková at Hockey Slovakia 
 

1995 births
Living people
American expatriate ice hockey players in Sweden
American people of Slovak descent
American women's ice hockey forwards
Choate Rosemary Hall alumni
Connecticut Whale (PHF) players
Ice hockey players from Connecticut
Middlebury College alumni
Middlebury Panthers athletes
People from Stratford, Connecticut
Slovak expatriate ice hockey players in Sweden
Slovak women's ice hockey forwards